Verkh-Shubinka is a rural locality (a selo) in Marushinsky Selsoviet, Tselinny District, Altai Krai, Russia. The population was 77 as of 2013. There are 9 streets.

Geography 
Verkh-Shubinka is located 51 km southwest of Tselinnoye (the district's administrative centre) by road. Marushka is the nearest rural locality.

References 

Rural localities in Tselinny District, Altai Krai